Jefferson Township is one of the fifteen townships of Noble County, Ohio, United States.  The 2000 census found 284 people in the township, 183 of whom lived in the unincorporated portions of the township.

Geography
Located in the southern part of the county, it borders the following townships:
Enoch Township - north
Stock Township - northeast
Elk Township - east
Salem Township, Washington County - south
Aurelius Township, Washington Township - southwest
Jackson Township - west
Olive Township - northwest corner

A part of the small village of Dexter City is located in far western Jefferson Township.

Name and history
It is one of twenty-four Jefferson Townships statewide.

Government
The township is governed by a three-member board of trustees, who are elected in November of odd-numbered years to a four-year term beginning on the following January 1. Two are elected in the year after the presidential election and one is elected in the year before it. There is also an elected township fiscal officer, who serves a four-year term beginning on April 1 of the year after the election, which is held in November of the year before the presidential election. Vacancies in the fiscal officership or on the board of trustees are filled by the remaining trustees.

References

External links
Noble County Chamber of Commerce 

Townships in Noble County, Ohio
Townships in Ohio